Jean-Jacques Kilama (born October 13, 1985, in Cameroon) is a Cameroonian-born Hong Kong professional footballer who currently plays for Hong Kong Premier League club Rangers.

Club career

Indonesia
Kilama played in Indonesia before moving to Hong Kong. Then his elder brother, Roger, a player who formerly played for Rangers (HKG) suggested to him to move to Hong Kong and join the Hong Kong First Division club.

Hong Kong

Rangers 
Kilama joined Rangers in 2008. Although he had an impressive performance in the first season, Rangers were nevertheless relegated. Therefore, he left the club for Fourway Rangers.

In July 2010, Kilama was selected for the Hong Kong League Selection friendly against Birmingham City at the Hong Kong Stadium.

Sun Hei
In the 2011–12 season, Kilama moved to Sun Hei from Fourway Rangers. On 22 October 2011, Kilama was sent off in the match against Rangers. Coach Ricardo hopes he can learn from this experience. On 7 January 2012, Kilama was sent off and gave away a penalty after elbowing Pegasus defender Lucas. Sun Hei lost the game 1-3.

Eastern 
Kilama moved to another Hong Kong Premier League club Eastern.

Tianjin Quanjian 
In December 2015, Kilama joined Chinese League One team Tianjin Quanjian, after having two impressive games against China national team for Hong Kong.

Pegasus 
On 1 February 2018, Kilama joined Pegasus on a free transfer, returning to Hong Kong following two seasons abroad.

Tai Po 
On 6 August 2018, Tai Po announced the singing of Kilama ahead of their preseason training camp.

Rangers 
On 16 September 2019, Kilama signed with Rangers, returning to the club after eight years.

On 10 September 2020, Rangers confirmed that Kilama had renewed his contract for another season.

in 20-21 season, Kiki features as the main role of the Ranger's defence and he scored 1 goals in 4 matches before the league was suspended in Sep 2020.

International career 
Kilama made his international debut for Hong Kong against Bhutan on 11 June 2015 in a 2018 FIFA World Cup qualifier.

2009 Hong Kong match fixing scandal
In October 2009, Happy Valley player Yu Yang offered a bribe to Kilama to play an unfair match against Happy Valley. However, Kilama rejected and told this to Rangers chairman Philip Lee as well as to the Hong Kong Football Association. On 5 May 2010, the ICAC confirmed his account and arrested five Chinese football players, including former Fourway Rangers Yu Yang.

Career statistics

International

Honours
Tianjin Quanjian
China League One: 2016

Tai Po
 Hong Kong Premier League: 2018–19

References

External links
Jean-Jacques Kilama at HKFA

1985 births
Living people
Hong Kong footballers
Hong Kong international footballers
Cameroonian footballers
Cameroonian expatriate footballers
Cameroonian expatriate sportspeople in Indonesia
Expatriate footballers in Indonesia
Cameroonian emigrants to Hong Kong
Expatriate footballers in China
Hong Kong expatriate sportspeople in China
China League One players
Chinese Super League players
Hong Kong Premier League players
Hong Kong Rangers FC players
Fourway Athletics players
Sun Hei SC players
Eastern Sports Club footballers
Tianjin Tianhai F.C. players
TSW Pegasus FC players
Tai Po FC players
Association football defenders
Hong Kong expatriate footballers
Hong Kong people of Cameroonian descent
Naturalized footballers of Hong Kong
Hong Kong League XI representative players